The Brooklyn Elevated Railroad was an elevated railroad company in Brooklyn, New York City, United States, operated from 1885 until 1899, when it was merged into the Brooklyn Rapid Transit Company-controlled Brooklyn Union Elevated Railroad.

Lines
Lexington Avenue Line, downtown to Cypress Hills
Myrtle Avenue Line, downtown to Ridgewood, Queens
Broadway Line, Williamsburg to Cypress Hills
via incline and Long Island Rail Road Atlantic Avenue Division to Jamaica, Queens; also via New York and Rockaway Beach Railway to Rockaway Park, Queens
Fifth Avenue Line, downtown to Bay Ridge
via incline and Prospect Park and Coney Island Railroad to Coney Island; also via Long Island Rail Road Bay Ridge Branch and Manhattan Beach Division to Manhattan Beach

See also
Kings County Elevated Railway, which operated the Fulton Street Line

References

Transportation in Brooklyn
Railroads on Long Island
Predecessors of the Brooklyn–Manhattan Transit Corporation
Defunct New York (state) railroads